Cal State Los Angeles Diablos football team represented the California State University, Los Angeles from the 1951 season through the 1977 season. Between 1947 and 1963, the university was known as the Los Angeles State College and the athletic teams were known as Los Angeles State. When the university was renamed the California State College at Los Angeles, the athletic teams were re-branded as Cal State Los Angeles. In 1980, the university adopted the current Golden Eagles nickname.

The Diablos competed as the member of the California Collegiate Athletic Association (CCAA) from 1951 through the 1968 season. Between 1969 and 1973 the Diablos were members of the Pacific Coast Athletic Association, before returning to the CCAA for the 1974 and 1975 seasons. They finished their final two seasons as an independent.

They played their home games throughout Los Angeles and played their final season at Campus Field on the university campus. In 27 years, the Diablos compiled an all-time record of 102 wins, 139 losses and 9 ties (102–139–9).

Seasons

References

 
American football teams established in 1951
1951 establishments in California
American football teams disestablished in 1977
1977 disestablishments in California